Adrian McCallum (17 December 1982 – 19 June 2019) was a British professional wrestler, professional wrestling promoter and actor, better known by his ring name Lionheart. He wrestled for numerous promotions in the British Independent wrestling circuit including Insane Championship Wrestling, in which he reigned as the ICW World Heavyweight Champion until his death, and Preston City Wrestling. He was also the owner of Ayrshire-based wrestling promotion "Pro Wrestling Elite".

Professional wrestling career

Insane Championship Wrestling 
On 11 February 2007 Lionheart made his Insane Championship Wrestling debut, losing to James Wallace.
On 3 April 2016, Lionheart captured the Insane Championship Wrestling Zero-G Championship from Davey Boy in a 6-way match at ICW Barramania II. He then proceeded to lose the title in a 6 Man Stairway to Heaven Match to Kenny Williams on 20 November at Fear & Loathing IX. On 2 December 2018 he won the ICW World Heavyweight Championship for the first time in his career, defeating former champion Jackie Polo in a Career vs. Title Match at Fear and Loathing XI.

Preston City Wrestling 
On 23 September 2011, Lionheart made his Preston City Wrestling debut on their "Road to Glory" show, defeating Jack Gallagher.  In March 2014, at a Preston City Wrestling show, McCallum's neck was broken in two places after receiving the Styles Clash following a match against AJ Styles. As a result of the injury doctors warned McCallum that he may never walk again. Just over a year later, McCallum defied doctors' orders and returned to in-ring competition in March 2015.

Other promotions 
In 2008, McCallum competed for the ROH World Championship against then-champion Nigel McGuinness at a One Pro Wrestling show in a triple threat match also involving Keith Myatt. In January 2011, McCallum competed for Total Nonstop Action Wrestling (TNA), losing to Jeff Jarrett at a houseshow in Glasgow, Scotland. Later that year he also competed for WWE, losing to Justin Gabriel in a dark match on SmackDown in Liverpool, England.

Death
On 19 June 2019, McCallum's death was announced on Twitter by ICW. His death was ruled a suicide.

McCallum had last tweeted the previous evening, in which he quoted the TV series After Life: "One day you will eat your last meal, you will smell your last flower, you will hug your friend for the last time. You might not know it's the last time, that's why you must do everything you love with passion."

Championships and accomplishments 
British Championship Wrestling
BCW Heavyweight Championship (2 times)
BCW Openweight Championship (1 time)
Danish Pro Wrestling
DPW Heavyweight Championship (1 time)
Insane Championship Wrestling
ICW World Heavyweight Championship (1 time)
ICW Zero-G Championship (2 times)
New Generation Wrestling
NGW Tag Team Championship (1 time) — with Joe Hendry and Kid Fite
One Pro Wrestling
1PW World Heavyweight Championship (1 time)
1PW World Heavyweight Title Tournament (2011)
Premier British Wrestling
PBW Heavyweight Championship (1 time)
PBW Tag Team Championship (1 time) with Wolfgang
Preston City Wrestling
PCW Heavyweight Championship (3 times)
PCW Tag Team Championship (1 time) — with Sha Samuels
Pro Wrestling Elite
PWE Tag Team Championship (1 time) — with Lou King Sharp
Real Deal Wrestling
RDW Heavyweight Championship (1 time)
Scottish Wrestling Alliance
NWA Scottish Heavyweight Championship (3 times)
Battlezone (2018)
Triple Team Promotions
King of the Castle (2007)
 Union of European Wrestling Alliances
 European Heavyweight Championship (1 time)
 Wrestlers Reunion Scotland
 The George Kidd Scottish Wrestling Hall of Fame (2018)

See also
 List of premature professional wrestling deaths

References

External links

1982 births
2019 deaths
English male professional wrestlers
Sportspeople from Coventry
21st-century professional wrestlers